{{Infobox tennis biography
 | name = Menno Oosting | image = Internationale kampioenschap tennis Melkhuisje Menno Oosting in actie, Bestanddeelnr 933-7188.jpg 
 | caption = 
 | country = 
 | residence =
 | birth_date = 
 | birth_place = Son en Breugel, Netherlands
 | death_date = 
 | death_place = Turnhout, Belgium
 | height = 
 | turnedpro = 1983
 | plays = Left-handed
 | careerprizemoney = $1,041,725
 | singlesrecord = 26–36
 | singlestitles = 0
 | highestsinglesranking = No. 72 (4 July 1988)  
 | AustralianOpenresult = 4R (1988)
 | FrenchOpenresult = 1R (1986, 1988)
 | Wimbledonresult = 3R (1988)
 | USOpenresult = 2R (1988)
 | doublesrecord = 239–257
 | doublestitles = 7
 | highestdoublesranking = No. 20 (13 February 1995) 
 | AustralianOpenDoublesresult = QF (1991)
 | FrenchOpenDoublesresult = 3R (1997) 
 | WimbledonDoublesresult = 3R (1995)
 | USOpenDoublesresult = 3R (1996)
}}Menno Oosting''' (17 May 1964 – 22 February 1999) was a professional tennis player from the Netherlands, who won seven ATP Tour doubles titles out of 18 finals in his career.

Born in Son en Breugel, North Brabant, Oosting reached a career-high ranking of 72 in the men's singles in 1988, and 20 in doubles in 1995. Oosting won the mixed-doubles title on Roland Garros in 1994, partnering Kristie Boogert. Oosting played in four Davis Cup ties for the Netherlands during the 1980s, posting a 5–3 record in singles and a 2–1 record in doubles. He died of injuries sustained in a car accident in Turnhout, Belgium.

Career finals

Doubles: 18 (7 wins, 11 losses)

References

External links
 
 
 

1964 births
1999 deaths
Dutch male tennis players
French Open champions
People from Son en Breugel
Road incident deaths in Belgium
Grand Slam (tennis) champions in mixed doubles
20th-century Dutch people
Sportspeople from North Brabant